Anneparthy is a village Nalgonda district of the Indian state of Telangana. It is located in Nalngonda mandal.

References

Villages in Nalgonda district